John McDonough may refer to:

John McDonough (businessman) (born 1951), British businessman, CEO of Carillion
John McDonough (Savannah mayor) (1849–1926), American politician, mayor of Savannah, Georgia, 1891–1895
John McDonough (sports executive) (born 1953), president of the Chicago Blackhawks
John McDonough (American football referee) (1916–1978), American pro football referee
John McDonough (piper) (died 1850s), Irish piper
John E. McDonough (born 1953), member of the Massachusetts House of Representatives, 1985–1997
John J. McDonough (mayor) (1895–1962), American politician, mayor of St. Paul, Minnesota, 1940–1948
John J. McDonough (Massachusetts politician), member of the Boston School Committee
John P. McDonough (politician) (born 1950), American politician from Maryland
John P. McDonough (chaplain) (1928–2021), Chief of Chaplains of the U.S. Air Force
John T. McDonough (1843–1917), American politician, Secretary of State of New York 1899–1902, and Associate Justice of the Supreme Court of the Philippines, 1903–1904
Jack McDonough (1879–1955), Australian rules footballer